Roy Einar Johansen (born 27 April 1960) is a Norwegian professional ice hockey head coach, currently serving as the head coach of Manglerud Star of the Fjordkraft-ligaen. He previously played for the Norwegian national ice hockey team. He participated at the Winter Olympics in 1984, 1988, and 1994.

He was the head coach of the Norwegian national team from 2001 until 2016. Johansen stepped down as national team coach in May 2016 and returned to Vålerenga Ishockey as head coach.

References

External links

1960 births
Living people
Ice hockey people from Oslo
Norwegian ice hockey centres
Olympic ice hockey players of Norway
Ice hockey players at the 1984 Winter Olympics
Ice hockey players at the 1988 Winter Olympics
Ice hockey players at the 1994 Winter Olympics
Vålerenga Ishockey players
Norway men's national ice hockey team coaches
Norwegian ice hockey coaches
Ice hockey coaches at the 2010 Winter Olympics
Ice hockey coaches at the 2014 Winter Olympics